Brave Eagle is a 26-episode half-hour western television series which aired on CBS from September 28, 1955, to March 14, 1956, with rebroadcasts continuing until June 6. Keith Larsen, who was of Norwegian descent, starred as Brave Eagle, a peaceful young Cheyenne chief.

The program was unconventional in that it reflects the Native American viewpoint in the settlement of the American West and was the first series to feature an American Indian character as a lead character.
 
Larsen's co-stars were Kim Winona (1930–1978), a Santee Sioux Indian, as Morning Star, Brave Eagle's romantic interest;  Anthony Numkena (born 1942) of Arizona, a Hopi Indian then using the stage name Keena Nomkeena, appeared as Keena, the adopted son of Brave Eagle; Pat Hogan (1920–1966) as Black Cloud, and Bert Wheeler (1895–1968) of the comedy team Wheeler & Woolsey, as the halfbreed Smokey Joe, full of tribal tall tales but accompanying wisdom. 
 
The episodes center upon routine activities among the Cheyenne, clashes with other tribes, attempts to prevent war, encroachment from white settlers, racial prejudice, and a threat of smallpox.

Episodes
{| class="wikitable plainrowheaders" style="width:100%; background:#fff;"

Guest stars

Ann Doran
William Fawcett
Anthony George
Jonathan Hale
Brett Halsey
Dennis Moore
Steve Pendleton
Steve Raines
Henry Rowland
Rick Vallin 
Lee Van Cleef
Pierre Watkin
Gloria Winters

Production notes

Though Brave Eagle was produced by NBC, it aired on CBS at 7:30 p.m. Wednesday preceding Arthur Godfrey and His Friends. Since the 1980s, several episodes have been released on videotape. Brave Eagle was filmed by Roy Rogers Productions on Rogers'  ranch in Chatsworth in Los Angeles, California, as well as the Corriganville Ranch in Simi Valley.Brave Eagle'''s principal competition was ABC's Disneyland, the Walt Disney anthology series.

Merchandising

Dell Comics released a Brave Eagle'' comic book series based on the TV show. It was published between 1956 and 1958 and drawn by Dan Spiegle.

References

External links 
 

1950s Western (genre) television series
1955 American television series debuts
1956 American television series endings
CBS original programming
Black-and-white American television shows
Television shows adapted into comics